The Mitsubishi Concept PX-MiEV is a prototype plug-in hybrid crossover utility vehicle, first exhibited at the Tokyo Motor Show in September 2009. It uses an  1.6-litre gasoline engine as a powerplant and generator for two 30 kW electric motors, one on each axle. Mitsubishi claims it to be capable of up to  under optimal driving conditions.

The vehicle's exterior styling supposedly gives clues to the design of the third generation of Mitsubishi Outlander, as well as showcasing some technologies which could make it into production.

The Concept PX was also exhibited at the Los Angeles Auto Show in November 2009 and the Geneva Motor Show in March 2010.

Concept PX-MiEV II
At the 2011 Tokyo Motor Show, Mitsubishi unveiled the Concept PX-MiEV II, which is a follow up to the PX-MiEV study first shown at the 2009 Tokyo Motor Show. Compared with the original concept, it has a higher roofline, more practical and larger side mirrors, more conventional looking alloy wheels, lights and bumper designs. It also has a pair of electric motors at both front and rear, delivering an output of  each.

See also
 Mitsubishi Outlander PHEV

References

P